Yelena Golesheva (married Scheers; born 12 July 1966) is a Russian-born female former track and field sprinter who competed for the Soviet Union and Russia, before obtaining Belgian citizenship. She has a personal best of 51.28 seconds for the 400 metres, set on 21 June 1989. She won a bronze medal in the 400 metres at the 1992 European Indoor Championships, and a silver medal at the 1993 World Championships in the 4 × 400 metres relay (ran in the heats only).

Career
She had most of her success in the national 4 × 400 metres relay teams. She had her first medals in 1989, taking bronze medals at the Universiade (with Yelena Vinogradova, Margarita Ponomaryova and Lyudmila Dzhigalova)  and World Cup (with Dzhigalova, Marina Shmonina and Yelena Ruzina). At the 1991 Universiade she took fifth in the individual 400 metres and shared in the relay silver alongside Inna Yevseyeva, Galina Moskvina and Anna Knoroz.

Her greatest individual achievement was at the 1992 European Athletics Indoor Championships, where she won a bronze medal behind Sandra Myers and fellow Soviet Olga Bryzgina. She took two major medals as a heats alternate runner at the 1993 World Championships in Athletics and the 1994 European Athletics Championships, being switched out for Irina Privalova and Svetlana Goncharenko, respectively. Her last medal as a finalist came at the 1994 Goodwill Games, where she, Yelena Andreyeva, Yelena Ruzina, and Tatyana Zakharova were the runners-up behind the United States.

She married a Belgian man named Scheers and took Belgian nationality, even going on to win a 400 m title at the Belgian Athletics Championships in 1997.

International competitions

National titles
Belgian Athletics Championships
400 m: 1997

See also
List of World Championships in Athletics medalists (women)
List of European Athletics Indoor Championships medalists (women)
List of eligibility transfers in athletics

References

External links

Living people
1966 births
Russian female sprinters
Soviet female sprinters
Belgian female sprinters
Russian emigrants to Belgium
World Athletics Championships medalists
World Athletics Championships athletes for Russia
European Athletics Championships medalists
Naturalised citizens of Belgium
Universiade bronze medalists for the Soviet Union
Universiade medalists in athletics (track and field)
Medalists at the 1989 Summer Universiade
Medalists at the 1991 Summer Universiade
Competitors at the 1994 Goodwill Games
Goodwill Games medalists in athletics